Kazimierz Braun (born June 29, 1936 in Mokrsko Dolne) is a Polish director, writer, and scholar.

Education
Braun earned a master's degree in Polish literature from Poznań University in 1958 and a master's in directing from the Aleksander Zelwerowicz National Academy of Dramatic Art in Warsaw in 1962. He earned a Ph.D. in letters from Poznań University in 1971, a habilitation in theatre from Wrocław University, and a habilitation in directing from the Warsaw School of Drama in 1988.

Career 
Braun became a tenured professor at the University at Buffalo in 1989. He made his debut as a professional theatre director in 1961, and as a professional television director in 1962. He has directed works at the Polish Theatre in Warsaw, Teatr Wybrzeże in Gdańsk, the Juliusz Słowacki Theatre in Kraków, and Teatr Solskiego in Tarnów, as well as in Canada, Germany, Ireland, and the United States. He was the artistic director of Teatr Osterwy in Lublin from 1967 to 1971, and general and artistic director there from 1971 to 1974. He was general and artistic director of the Contemporary Theatre in Wrocław from 1975 to 1984, but was fired by the Communist authorities because of his oppositional activities.

Since 1985, Braun has lived and worked in the United States. He has directed at the Guthrie Theatre in Minneapolis, the Odyssey Theatre in Los Angeles, the Chicago Actors Ensemble, and Kavinoky Theatre in Buffalo. His best-known directorial works include plays by Cyprian Norwid (13 shows), Tadeusz Różewicz (19 shows), William Shakespeare (12 shows in Polish and English), and Adam Mickiewicz (two shows). He has taught at the University of Wrocław, New York University, Swarthmore College, the University of California, Santa Cruz, and the University at Buffalo.

Braun has translated works from English, French, and Italian into Polish, and from Polish, French, and Russian into English.

Personal life
Braun's father, Juliusz Braun, was a lawyer, professor of ecology, Catholic activist, and political prisoner under Joseph Stalin. His mother was Elżbieta Korwin-Szymanowska. They both died in 1990.

Braun is married to Zofia Reklewska-Braun, a writer and theatre historian. They have three children (Dr. Monika Braun, a writer and academic; Grzegorz Braun, a filmmaker and writer; and Dr. Justyna Braun, an academic) and five granddaughters (Anna, Joanna, Aniela, Zofia, and Elżbieta).

Credits
Braun has directed dozens of theatre productions in Poland and the United States, including:
 1961: Karol / On the Sea / Strip-tease (Sławomir Mrożek), Gdańsk
 1962: The Ring of a Great Lady (Cyprian Norwid), Warsaw
 1962: Two Theatres (Jerzy Szaniawski), Warsaw
 1963: Caucasian Chock Circle (Bertolt Brecht), Gdańsk
 1963: Romeo and Juliet (William Shakespeare), Warsaw
 1965: The Wedding (Stanisław Wyspiański), Toruń
 1967: November's Night (Wyspiański), Gdańsk
 1968: Hamlet (Shakespeare), Lublin
 1968: Kleopatra and Cezar (Norwid), Lublin
 1970: Interrupted Act (Tadeusz Różewicz), Lublin
 1970: Behind the Wings (Norwid), Kraków
 1971: The Ashes (Stefan Żeromski), director's adaptation, Television Theatre
 1972: The Deliverance (Wyspiański), Lublin
 1973: The Old Woman (Różewicz), Lublin
 1977: Operetta (Witold Gombrowicz), Wrocław
 1978: The Forefathers' Eve (Adam Mickiewicz), Wrocław
 1979: Birth Rate (Różewicz), director's adaptation, Wrocław
 1982: The Forefathers' Eve (Mickiewicz), director's adaptation, Wrocław
 1982: Twelfth Night (Shakespeare), Wrocław
 1983: The Plague (Albert Camus), director's adaptation, Wrocław
 1984: The Trap (Różewicz), Wrocław
 1986: Rhinoceros (Eugène Ionesco), Minneapolis
 1987: The Hunger Artist (Różewicz), Buffalo
 1988: The Shoemakers (Witkacy), Los Angeles
 1989: King Lear (Shakespeare), Buffalo
 1990: Immigrant Queen (Braun), Toronto
 1991: As You Like It (Shakespeare), Buffalo
 1995: Tango (Sławomir Mrożek), Knoxville, Tennessee
 1996: A Man for All Seasons (Robert Bolt), Buffalo
 1999: Richard III (Shakespeare), Buffalo
 2003: Europe (Jerzy Braun), Tarnów
 2004: Paderewski's Children (Braun), Buffalo
 2006: The Fall of a Stone House (Brandstaetter), Tarnów
 2006: Card Index Scattered (Różewicz), Buffalo
 2008: The Tales of Pola Negri (Braun), Toronto
 2010: The Book of Christopher Columbus (Paul Claudel), Steubenville, Ohio
 2011: Father Maximilian's Cell (Braun), Tarnów
 2012: Ordonka's Mysteries (Braun), Toronto
 2012: The Power and the Glory (Graham Greene), director's adaptation, Buffalo
 2013: The Tempest (Shakespeare), Buffalo

Scholarly books

 1967: Teofil Trzciński (with Zofia Reklewska-Braun), PIW, Warsaw
 1971: Cyprian Norwid’s Theatre Without Theatre, PIW, Warsaw
 1972: Theatre of Communion, Wyd. Literackie, Kraków
 1975: New Theatre in the World, WaiF, Warsaw
 1979: The Second Reform of Theatre, Ossolineum, Wrocław
 1982: Theatre Space, PWN, Warsaw
 1984: The Great Reform of Theatre, Ossolineum, Wrocław
 1994: Polish Theatre 1939-1989, Semper, Warsaw
 1996: A History of Polish Theatre 1939-1989, Greenwood Press, Westport, Connecticut
 2000: Theatre Directing, Mellen Press, Lewiston, New York
 2003: A Concise History of Polish Theatre, Mellen Press, Lewiston
 2005: A Concise History of American Theatre, Wyd. UAM, Poznań
 2010: Lady Designer, Jadwiga Pożakowska, Muzeum Narodowe, Gdańsk
 2011: Brothers Adamowicz (with Zofia Reklewska-Braun), Wyd. Uniw. Rzeszowskiego
 2013: My Różewicz’s Theatre, Wyd. Uniw. Rzeszowskiego
 2014: My Norwid’s Theatre, Wyd. Uniw. Rzeszowskiego

Novels and plays
 1989: The Monument, Instytut Literacki, Paris
 1993: Helena: The Story of Modjeska, High Park Press, Toronto
 1996: Farewell to Alaska, PAX, Warszawa
 1996: The Story of Norwid: A One-Man Drama, Bernardinum, Pelplin
 1999: Day of Witness, Wyd. 4K, Bytom
 2003: A Bird on Stilts: Short Stories, Wyd. A. Marszałek, Toruń
 2005: Day of Witness (expanded edition), Wyd. Św. Wojciecha, Poznań
 2006: Radiation, Archiwum Emigracji, Toruń
 2008: Ten Days in People's Poland, Norbertinum, Lublin
 2011: Maximilianus, Wyd. Bratni Zew, Kraków
 2011: Tarnów’s Wind of Freedom, Wyd. Biblioteka Publiczna, Tarnów
 2013: Good Priests (with Zofia Reklewska-Braun), Bernardinum, Pelplin

Awards and honors
 1963: Best Director, Caucasian Chock Circle (Brecht), Toruń Theatre Festival
 1964: Best Director, Enchanted Circle (Rydel), Television Theatre Festival
 1965: Best Director, Actor (Norwid), Television Theatre Festival and Kalisz Theatre Festival 
 1966: Best Director, The Wedding (Wyspiański), Toruń Theatre Festival
 1970: Best Director, Interrupted Act (Różewicz), Kalisz Theatre Festival
 1971: Medal for Merit to Culture, Poland
 1976: Medal for Educational Theatre, Poland
 1978: Gold Cross of Merit, Poland
 1979: Award for the Mise-en-Scène, Operetta (Gombrowicz), International Theatre Festival, Sitges, Spain
 1980: Golden Fredro Award for Director, Birth Rate (Różewicz), Wrocław
 1980: Japanese Foundation Award
 1984: Golden Fredro Award for Director, The Plague (Camus), Wrocław
 1985: Independent Culture Award, Poland 
 1990: Guggenheim Foundation Award, United States
 1996: Director, Best Production in Buffalo, A Man for All Seasons (Bolt) 
 1997: Chivalry Cross of the Polish Order of Merit 
 2001: Aurum Literary Award, Toronto
 2001: Fulbright Program, United States
 2003: Turzański Foundation Award, Canada
 2004: Minister of Education Award, Poland
 2005: Polish-American Congress Annual Award
 2005: Medal for Merit to Culture, Poland
 2005: Officer's Cross of the Polish Order of Merit
 2007: Medal for Merit to Culture, Poland
 2011: Golden Owl Award, Austria
 2011: Commander's Cross of the Polish Order of Merit

References

External links
 Webpage: Kazimierz Braun:  http://www.acsu.buffalo.edu/~kaz/ (includes several photographs)

External links

1936 births
Living people
Officers of the Order of Merit of the Republic of Poland
Polish theatre directors
People from Jędrzejów County
University at Buffalo faculty
Recipient of the Meritorious Activist of Culture badge